Bolton (2021 population 26,795) is an unincorporated village that is the most populous community in the town of Caledon, Ontario. It is located beside the Humber River in the Region of Peel, approximately 50 kilometres northwest of Toronto. In regional documents, it is referred to as a 'Rural Service Centre'. It has 26,795 residents in 9,158 total dwellings. The downtown area that historically defined the village is in a valley, through which flows the Humber River. The village extends on either side of the valley to the north and south.

Geography
The conservation lands' forests dominate a large part of the northwest, the north and the east, including along the Humber valley. These conservation lands have created several recreational areas, including parts of the Humber Valley Heritage Trail.  Farmland and the protected Oak Ridges Moraine dominate the landscape surrounding the village.

There are two 400-series highways nearby, including Highway 427, about 9 km southeast (the highway's northern terminus being at Major Mackenzie Drive), and Highway 400, about 14 km east (exit at King Road).

History
The community, formerly known as Bolton Mills, was founded around 1822 when James Bolton helped build a flour mill for his relative George Bolton. By 1857, Bolton was a village with a population of 700 in the Township of Albion in Peel County.

It was established on the Humber River, on the line of the proposed Toronto, Grey and Bruce Railway. There were stages to and from Weston. The average price of land was $40 to $50 per acre.

The suburban housing developments began near King Street, up to 15th Sideroad of Albion (now known as Bolton Heights Road). The urban area did not expand until the late 1970s and early 1980s, which also led to development of an industrial area in the southwest. The urban area up to Columbia Way (the northern boundary) began booming in the late 1980s.

Housing developments continued towards the southern and western parts of the town (about 1 km northwest of the heart of town) in the 1990s and the 15th Sideroad in about 1995, especially to the north. The industrial area began adding buildings to the southwest, up to Simpson Road. The urban areas merged with the southern part in 2000 and the northwest.

Future growth is a subject of debate amongst the village's residents, as well as within the upper- and lower-tier municipal governments.

Demographics
As of the 2021 census, the top three ethnic groups in Bolton are Italian (11,480; 43.4%), English (3,540; 13.4%) and Canadian (3,120; 11.8%).

Organizations
 Freemasonry
 Kinsmen Club of Bolton, chartered in 1964

Media

The 1996 Warner Bros. film Twister and the 2005 film Four Brothers were partially shot here.

Education
Bolton is home to several public and Catholic schools:

Public Elementary Institutions:
Allan Drive Middle School
Ellwood Memorial Public School
James Bolton Public School
Macville Public School (just outside Bolton located in Caledon)

Public Secondary Institutions:
Humberview Secondary School

Catholic Elementary Institutions:
Holy Family Elementary School
St. John Paul II Elementary School
St. John the Baptist Elementary School
St. Nicholas Elementary School
Catholic Secondary Institutions:
St. Michael Catholic Secondary School
Private Institutions:
King's College School (Just outside Bolton located in Caledon)
Creative Children's Montessori School

Notable residents
Lorne Duguid – hockey player
Keith McCreary – hockey player, former Chairman of the NHL Alumni, politician
James East – politician
Todd Elik – hockey player
Organik – musician and founder of King of the Dot
Steven Halko – hockey player
Peter Holland – hockey player
Andrew Mangiapane – hockey player
Skye Sweetnam – singer
Jason Saggo – UFC Fighter
Joseph Shabason – ambient jazz musician

References

External links

Town of Caledon – official website

Neighbourhoods in Caledon, Ontario
Populated places established in 1794
1794 establishments in the British Empire